The 2010 FC Dallas season was the fifteenth season of the team's existence.

Dallas' season was highlighted by qualifying for the first MLS Cup Championship Game in franchise history, where they ultimately came up short, losing to the Colorado Rapids in overtime, from an own goal by George John who inadvertently deflected a ball into his own net. In spite of the MLS Cup shortcomings, Dallas earned a preliminary spot in the 2011–12 edition of the CONCACAF Champions League, for next year.

During the regular season, the club set a team record for longest home unbeaten streak, with six matches. Additionally, during this unbeaten streak from May to October, Dallas set an MLS record for longest road unbeaten streak (11 matches) and overall unbeaten streak (15) before eventually losing to Real Salt Lake towards the end of the season. The unbeaten streak, gave Dallas their best regular season record since 2007. David Ferreira of Dallas was crowned the league's Most Valuable Player.

Outside of MLS, the club a short-lived spell in the U.S. Open Cup play-in proper. In an April 28 qualification match against D.C. United, the club, fielded primarily by reserves, lost 4–2.

Background

Review

Preseason

March 

Dallas began their fifteenth Major League Soccer regular season with a 1–1 draw in a home match against the Houston Dynamo on March 27, 2009.

April

May

June

July

August 

FC Dallas  hosted a friendly against the 2009–10 UEFA Champions League Champions Inter Milan on August 5, 2010.

September 
The month of September saw Dallas obtain several landmark records for their club and for the MLS.  As of September 21, 2010, those records are:

Longest Active Home Winning Streak – 6 Games – Club Record – ending with their tie at home to New York Red Bulls

Longest Road Unbeaten Streak – 11 Games – MLS & Club Record

Longest Active Unbeaten Streak – 15 Games – MLS & Club Record

In September, a heated match with New York Red Bulls on September 16 produced well-publicized controversy. New York Red Bulls forward & designated player, Thierry Henry injured FC Dallas goalie Kevin Hartman in celebration of the Red Bulls' first goal of the evening by Mehdi Ballouchy in the 48+ minute of the match..   Henry kicked the ball after the play had ended. FC Dallas goalkeeper Kevin Hartman was on the other side of the ball and suffered a knee injury as a result. The Disciplinary Committee determined Henry's action to be unsporting and issued a $2,000 fine.

As a result of Henry's actions, FC Dallas coach Schellas Hyndman spoke out against the referees decision; saying it showed a "lack of courage".  Further controversy was ignited following the MLS Disciplinary Committee's decision to fine Henry with no suspension preceding New York Red Bull's next match against star-studded Los Angeles Galaxy. FC Dallas player Brek Shea, however, was fined $1000, red-carded and suspended for an additional game during the same match.

October 

On October 2, the club qualified for the playoffs for the first time since 2007. They qualified following a 2–1 victory at Gillette Stadium against the New England.

The regular season ended on a rough patch for the Toros, as they would have to travel for away games against Los Angeles Galaxy and Real Salt Lake; at the time the first-place and second-place clubs in the league, respectively. The two game-trip ended in a pair of back-to-back losses for Dallas on October 17 and 23, and ultimately ended their chance for winning the Supporters' Shield.

Amid controversy surrounding the playoff's format, Dallas was the third seed Western Conference bracket, drawn against the second-place West club and MLS Cup defending champions, Real Salt Lake.

The Conference Semifinals served as a two-leg, home and away aggregate series with no away goals rule enforced. Dallas hosted Salt Lake on October 30. Despite an early goal from Fabian Espindola in the fifth-minute, the Toros would rally with a pair of goals from Jeff Cunningham and Eric Avila, giving not only them victory, but a lead in the a series.

November 

The first leg of the quarterfinals was played at FC Dallas' home ground Pizza Hut Park on October 30, in the northern Dallas suburb of Frisco. Early in the match, Salt Lake striker Fabián Espíndola bagged a fifth-minute goal to give the visitors a critical away goal and a 1–0 lead in the match and on aggregate. The team rebounded from the setback thanks to a 44th-minute equalizer from Jeff Cunningham. Shortly into the second half, things looked more promising for Dallas when a dangerous sliding tackle in the 49th minute from Salt Lake's midfielder Javier Morales resulted in an immediate red-card ejection from the match, resulting in the Royals having to play a man down. Kittian international, Atiba Harris was ejected in the 88th minute, causing a 10 vs. 10 match for the final two minutes before injury time. While things were looking to stay on parity for the first leg, a last-minute goal from Dallas' Eric Avila gave the Toros a needed 2–1 victory over RSL.

Dallas traveled out to Salt Lake City to take on the Royals for the second leg on November 6. Although Dallas had a 2–1 aggregate lead, they were playing in Rio Tinto Stadium, considered by many to be one of the most intimidating soccer atmospheres in the United States, where Salt Lake hadn't lost a match since May 2009. The match drew a near-capacity crowd of roughly 19,500 spectators. In the 17th minute of the match, a goal from Dallas midfielder and American international Dax McCarty gave the Toros a 3–1 lead on aggregate and a 1–0 lead for the match. For a majority of the match, deep into the second half, Dallas held this lead. A late equalizer from Robbie Findley leveled the game at 1–1, but it was too little, too late for RSL as the Dallas eliminated the defending champions, 3–1 on aggregate.

November 6's victory over Salt Lake propelled Dallas into the Western Conference finals against the MLS Cup runners-up from last year, Los Angeles Galaxy. Heralding international superstars such as David Beckham and Landon Donovan, the Galaxy were coming off a run in the regular season, capturing the MLS Supporters' Shield with a 17–7–8 record. The Galaxy had defeated Seattle Sounders FC in their quarterfinal series to qualify for the championship. Since the Galaxy were the top seed in the Western Conference bracket, while Dallas was the third, Los Angeles hosted the final.

In front of a sold-out capacity crowd of 27,000 at the Galaxy's home ground The Home Depot Center, Dallas dismantled the Galaxy with goals from David Ferreira, George John and Marvin Chávez. The 3–0 victory for Dallas avenged their 2–0 loss at the Home Depot Center, and they handed the Galaxy their worst loss at home since a 4–1 defeat to the Puerto Rico Islanders in a Champions League play-in proper. The victory gave Dallas a spot in their first ever MLS Cup final.

The MLS Cup final was held on Sunday, November 21, 2010 in Toronto, Canada. The match between the Colorado Rapids and the FC Dallas  Bulls kicked off at 8:30 pm EST. The final began slowly with the first goal not coming until the 35th minute. A strike from FC Dallas midfielder David Ferriera gave the Bulls a 1–0 advantage. The equalizer came from Colorado Rapids forward Conor Casey in the 56th minute. The game-winning goal came by way of a deflected shot from Colorado Rapids forward Macoumba Kandji. Kandji's shot deflected off the leg of FC Dallas defender George John and trickled into the net past keeper, Kevin Hartman. Rapids head coach Gary Smith commented following the victory, "Honestly, I don't mind how they come. If they're winners, it doesn't matter. The overriding thought is they must be under some pressure to make that mistake."

Transfers

In

Out

Loan

In

Out

Major League Soccer

Standings 

Conference

Overall

Results summary

Match results

Regular season

Playoffs 

FC Dallas qualified for the 2010 MLS Cup playoffs following a 2–1 victory at New England on October 2. Amid the controversy surrounding the playoff structure, Dallas was seeded as the number three team in the Western Conference bracket, drawn against the second-place West club and MLS Cup defending champions, Real Salt Lake. The draw took place at Major League Soccer's headquarters in New York City on October 24.

The Conference Semifinals served as a two-leg, home and away aggregate series with no away goals rule enforced. Dallas hosted Salt Lake on October 30. Despite an early goal from Fabian Espindola in the fifth-minute, Dallas would rally with a pair of goals from Jeff Cunningham and Eric Avila, giving not only them victory, but a lead in the a series.

RSL and Dallas played at Rio Tinto Stadium in Sandy on November 6 for the second leg. A 17th-minute goal from Dax McCarty gave Dallas a 3–1 advantage in the series, and not only jeopardized Salt Lake's chance for going on the Western Conference Championship, but the chance that Salt Lake would end their home-match unbeaten streak. A goal from Robbie Findley ensured the streak would stay alive, but the tie secured Dallas a spot in the Western Conference Championship, as Dallas would advance 3–2 on aggregate.

Dallas played in Los Angeles against the Galaxy for the Western Conference Championship. Dallas shutout LA 3–0, becoming the final original MLS club to make it to the MLS Cup.

Dallas took an early lead over the Colorado Rapids in the MLS Cup, but the Rapids came back to score a goal in the second half and forced overtime. Early into overtime, a cross deflected off of Dallas defender George John and into Dallas' net. Despite several late chances for Dallas, the Rapids held on, win the MLS Cup 2–1 off the overtime own goal.

U.S. Open Cup 

With an 11th-place finish in Major League Soccer last season, Dallas did not automatically qualify for the 2010 edition of the U.S. Open Cup. Instead, they would have to qualify in a series of matches against unqualified MLS clubs to enter the tournament. They were paired against last year's 10th-place finisher, D.C. United; where they played the United at RFK Stadium on April 28.

Goals from Bruno Guarda and Dax McCarty would not be enough as Dallas would fall 4–2 to the United to end their short USOC campaign.

Jerseys

Squad 
As of August 21, 2010.

Formation 

4–5–1 formation against Real Salt Lake on Nov. 6

Notes

FC Dallas seasons
FC Dallas
FC Dallas
FC Dallas season